The Virginia Cave Board, originally known as the Virginia Cave Commission, was established by the Virginia General Assembly in 1979.

References

External links 
http://www.dcr.virginia.gov/natural-heritage/vcbminutes

State parks of Virginia
1979 establishments in Virginia